The Pakistan Engineering Council (acronym: PEC) is a professional body for accreditation of engineering education and regulation of engineering profession in Pakistan. It was established on 10 January 1976 by the Parliament under the PEC Act, 1976. The council also registers engineers and professional engineers and grants license to consulting and constructing/operating engineering firms working in Pakistan.

Overview
Pakistan Engineering Council represents the engineering community in the country and assists the Government of Pakistan at the federal and provincial levels. It also acts as a think tank to the government and undertakes efforts to establish scientific standards for engineering innovations and services. Its headquarters is located in Islamabad and regional/branch/liaison offices are located in main cities of Pakistan. The council became a provisional member of Washington Accord in 2010 and was admitted as a full member in 2017.

In 2011, it became a provisional member of the International Professional Engineer (IntPE) Agreement (IPEA), and became a full member in 2018.

In March 2021, PEC signed a memorandum of understanding with the Shenzhen University to develop and apply Internet of things as part of the Belt and Road Initiative in China and Pakistan.

Affiliations 

 Washington Accord
International Professional Engineers Agreement (IPEA)
Federation of Engineering Institutions of Asia and the Pacific (FEIAP)
Federation of Engineering Institutions of Islamic Countries (FEIIC)
Network of Accreditation Bodies for Engineering Education in Asia (NABEEA)

Offices

Headquarters 
Pakistan Engineering Council headquarters are located at Ataturk Avenue (East) in the G-5/2 sector of Islamabad. President Muhammad Zia-ul-Haq laid the foundation stone of the building on 28 July 1987. The building became functional on 14 October 1992 after Prime Minister Nawaz Sharif inaugurated it.

Regional offices 
PEC further opened the following regional offices in the provincial capitals of Pakistan:

 Karachi Branch Office (inaugurated on 23 June 1987)
 Lahore Branch Office (inaugurated on 30 January 1988)
 Quetta Branch Office (inaugurated on 17 February 1988)
 Peshawar Branch Office (inaugurated on 27 March 1988)
 Multan Branch Office (inaugurated on 1 June 2016)
 Hyderabad Branch Office (inaugurated on 1 June 2016)

See also
 List of engineering universities and colleges in Pakistan

References

External links
 
 Ministry of Science and Technology website
 International Engineering Alliance website

1976 establishments in Pakistan
Professional associations based in Pakistan
Pakistani engineering organisations
Pakistan federal departments and agencies
Government agencies established in 1976
Mechanical engineering organizations
Electrical engineering organizations
Chemical engineering organizations
Aerospace engineering organizations
Civil engineering organizations
Professional certification in engineering
Science and technology in Pakistan
Organizations established in 1976